Sir David John Charlton Meyrick, 4th Baronet (2 December 1926 – 6 February 2004) was a British agriculturalist and rower who competed for Great Britain in the 1948 Summer Olympics.

Meyrick was born in Towcester, Northamptonshire, the eldest son of Colonel Sir Thomas Meyrick, 3rd Baronet, and his wife Ivy (née Pilkington).  He was educated at Eton, where he was an excellent rower, and at Trinity Hall, Cambridge.  He rowed for Trinity Hall in the Head of the River race. In 1947 and 1948, he was a member of the victorious Cambridge crews in the Boat Races. Most of the Cambridge crew of 1948 also rowed for Leander Club and Meyrick stroked the eight at Henley Royal Regatta. The Leander eight were selected to row for Great Britain in the 1948 Summer Olympics and won the silver medal.

After university, Meyrick became resident land agent on the Earl of Coventry's Croome Estate in Worcestershire. Seven years later he moved to Pembrokeshire and began farming. The family had lived in Pembrokeshire since the 16th century. He succeeded in the baronetcy on the death of his father in 1983 and inherited the family home at Gumfreston. 
He was on the Council of the Royal Agricultural Society, as the South Wales representative, a  steward at the Royal Show at Stoneleigh, and a member of the National Farmers Union and the Country Landowners' and Rural Business Association in Pembrokeshire.

Meyrick suffered a stroke at the age of 60 and died at Pembroke at the age of 77.

See also
List of Cambridge University Boat Race crews
Rowing at the 1948 Summer Olympics

References

1926 births
2004 deaths
People educated at Eton College
Alumni of Trinity Hall, Cambridge
English male rowers
Cambridge University Boat Club rowers
Olympic rowers of Great Britain
Rowers at the 1948 Summer Olympics
Olympic silver medallists for Great Britain
Meyrick, Sir John, 4th Baronet
People from Towcester
Olympic medalists in rowing
Medalists at the 1948 Summer Olympics